Timo Peltola (born June 12, 1972) is a Finnish judoka.

Achievements

References
 

1972 births
Living people
Finnish male judoka
Judoka at the 2004 Summer Olympics
Olympic judoka of Finland
Place of birth missing (living people)
21st-century Finnish people